Al Goodhart (January 26, 1905 – November 30, 1955) a member of ASCAP, was born in New York City and attended DeWitt Clinton High School. During his lifetime he was a radio announcer, vaudeville pianist and special materials writer. He also owned a theatrical agency. 

Following his 1931 hit "I Apologize", he concentrated on composing music, being most prolific during the 1930s. He traveled to England and wrote music there from 1934 to 1937. With collaborators Al Hoffman and Maurice Sigler, Goodhart scored music for the stage and screen, particularly musical films starring Jessie Matthews. During WWII, Goodhart travelled with the USO, entertaining troops in the United States and abroad.

His other chief collaborators included Mann Curtis, Sammy Lerner, Ed Nelson, Kay Twomey and Allan Roberts.

He died in 1955, aged 50.

Songs
1930:
Dangerous Nan McGrew (movie)

1931:
I Apologize (written with Al Hoffman and Ed G. Nelson)

1932:
Auf Wiedersehen, My Dear (written with Milton Ager, Al Hoffman and Ed G. Nelson)
Happy-Go-Lucky-You
Fit as a Fiddle (written with Arthur Freed and Al Hoffman)
It's Winter Again

1933:
Roll Up the Carpet
Meet Me in the Gloaming
Two Buck Tim from Timbuctoo

1934:
I Saw Stars (written with Al Hoffman and Maurice Sigler)
Jimmy Had a Nickel
Who Walks in When I Walk Out? (written with Ralph Freed and Al Hoffman)
Why Don't You Practice What You Preach?
Your Guess Is Just as Good as Mine

1935:
Black Coffee (written with Al Hoffman and Maurice Sigler)

1936:
(This'll Make You Whistle - English stage show) - Crazy With Love
I'm in a Dancing Mood (written with Al Hoffman and Maurice Sigler)
There Isn't Any Limit to My Love (written with Al Hoffman and Maurice Sigler)
My Red Letter Day (written with Al Hoffman and Maurice Sigler)
(She Shall Have Music - English movie) - She Shall Have Music (written with Al Hoffman and Maurice Sigler)
My First Thrill
(First a Girl - English movie) - Everything's in Rhythm with My Heart
Say the Word and It's Yours (written with Al Hoffman and Maurice Sigler)
I Can Wiggle My Ears
(Jack of All Trades - English movie) - Where There's You, There's Me
(Come Out of the Pantry - English movie) - Everything Stops for Tea (written with Al Hoffman and Maurice Sigler)
There's Always A Happy Ending

1937:
(Gangway - English movie) - Gangway (written with Al Hoffman and Sammy Lerner)
Lord and Lady Whoozis (written with Al Hoffman and Sammy Lerner)

1939:
 Romance Runs in the Family (written with Al Hoffman and Manny Kurtz)

1942:
Johnny Doughboy found a Rose in Ireland (written with Allan Roberts and Kay Twomey)
Better Not Roll Those Blue, Blue Eyes

1947:
Serenade of the Bells (written with Kay Twomey and Alfred J. Urbano)
Who Were You Kissing?

1948:
In a Little Book Shop

1949:
Festival of Roses (written with Dick Manning)

1950:
The Place Where I Worship (written with Florence Tarr)

Other songs

Black Eyed Susan Brown (written with Al Hoffman and Herbert Magidson)
I Was Watching a Man Paint a Fence (written with Ed G. Nelson and Harry Pease)
I Wish I Had a Record (written with Hal David and Arthur Altman)
May All Your Troubles Be Little Ones
Smith And Jones (written with Kay Twomey)
Stop The Music (written with Art Harry Berman)
Those Things Money Can't Buy (written with Ruth Poll)
Watching The Trains Go By (written with Tot Seymour)
With a Hey Nonny Nonny (written with Ralph Freed and Al Hoffman)

Notable performers of his songs
 "Auf Wiedersehen, My Dear" (Ray Anthony, Comedy Harmonists, Vera Lynn, Tony Martin, Jerry Vale)
"Fit as a Fiddle" (Doris Day, Donald O'Connor)
 "I Apologize" (Billy Eckstine, Bing Crosby, Engelbert Humperdinck, Jackie Gleason, Al Hirt, Artie Shaw, Bobby Vinton, Dinah Washington)
 "I Saw Stars" (Billy Butterfield, Teddi King, Marion McPartland)
 "I'm in a Dancing Mood" (Dave Brubeck, Tommy Dorsey)
 "Johnny Doughboy Found a Rose in Ireland" (Kenny Baker, Dennis Day, Sammy Kaye, Kay Kyser, Guy Lombardo)
 "The Place Where I Worship" (Red Foley, Sons of the Pioneers, Gene Autry)
 "Serenade of the Bells" (Gene Autry, Ray Coniff, the Fleetwoods, Jo Stafford, Sammy Kaye)
"Those Things Money Can't Buy" (Nat King Cole)
 "Watching the Trains Go By" (Perry Como)
 "Who Walks In When I Walk Out?" (Louis Armstrong, Ella Fitzgerald)
 "Romance Runs in the Family" (Kay Kyser)
 "Ya Got Love" (Bennie Moten)

References

1905 births
1955 deaths
American male composers
Musicians from New York City
DeWitt Clinton High School alumni
20th-century American composers
ASCAP composers and authors
20th-century American male musicians